Proserpina is the Roman goddess of springtime and wife of Pluto. 

Proserpina may also refer to:

 Proserpina (gastropod), a genus of land snails in the family Proserpinidae
 Proserpina Dam, a Roman gravity dam in Badajoz, Extremadura, Spain
 26 Proserpina, an asteroid discovered in 1853
 Proserpina, an 1879 book by John Ruskin about wayside flowers
 "Proserpina", a 2012 song by Martha Wainwright from Come Home to Mama

See also
 Proserpin (Kraus), a 1781 opera by Joseph Martin Kraus
 Proserpine (disambiguation)